XHART-FM is a radio station in Zacatepec and Jojutla, Morelos. It broadcasts on 89.3 FM and is known as Radio Señal.

History
After 20 years of applying for the station, XEART-AM 1590 (later 1520) received its concession on October 30, 1981 and signed on two weeks later, on November 13. Most of the history of this station revolves around the marriage of Andrés Eloy Martínez Silva and Araceli Rojas Tenorio. Rojas Tenorio was a pioneering female politician in Morelos; she is the mother of Andrés Eloy Martínez, representative in the 62nd Chamber of Deputies for Morelos.

On October 31, 1998, XEART broadcast a dramatization of The War of the Worlds by H.G. Wells; this resulted in panic on behalf of the audience, which believed it was an actual event, despite warnings before the program.

In 2011, it migrated to FM as XHART-FM 89.3.

The 2017 Puebla earthquake caused heavy damage to the station's studios in the Plaza Yuliana in Jojutla; the station relocated to Zacatepec after the event.

References

External links
89.3 Radio Señal Facebook

Radio stations in Morelos
Radio stations established in 1981